Asemonea cuprea is a jumping spider species in the genus Asemonea  that lives in Zambia. It was first described by Wanda Wesołowska in 2009.

References

Salticidae
Fauna of Zambia
Spiders of Africa
Spiders described in 2009

Taxa named by Wanda Wesołowska